Pingyao, officially Pingyao Ancient City, is a walled city in central Shanxi, China, famed for its importance in Chinese economic history and for its well-preserved Ming and Qing urban planning and architecture. Administratively, it comprises the town of Gutao in Pingyao County, Jinzhong. It has a population of about 500,000.

The town is first recorded BC and has been the seat of local government since at least the Qin. By the 16th century, it was a regional financial hub; some consider it to have been the financial centre of the Qing Empire in the late 19th century. It is a AAAAA-rated tourist attraction, and the settlement and the outlying Zhenguo Temple and Shuanglin Temple became a World Heritage Site in 1997.

History
There was already a settlement in place at Pingyao by the reign of the Xuan King (.BC), when the Zhou raised earthen ramparts around the site.

In the Spring and Autumn period, the county belonged to the kingdom of Jin. It was part of the kingdom of Zhao in the Warring States period. Under the Qin, it was known as Pingtao. During the Han Dynasty, it was known as the seat of Zhongdu County.

Pingyao served as the financial center of the region from the 16th century and of the entire Qing Empire during the late 19th century. During those times, there were more than 20 financial institutions within the city, comprising more than half of the total in the whole country. Rishengchang was the first and largest, controlling almost half of China's silver trade under the late Qing before going bankrupt in 1914 in the aftermath of the Xinhai Revolution.

Organized restorations have been undertaken periodically since the 15th century, the most recent phase beginning in 1979. In 1986, China designated Pingyao as one of the Chinese Historical and Cultural Cities.  In 2004, part of the southern walls collapsed; they have since been reconstructed. In 2015, Pingyao ancient city became a national 5A-class tourist attraction.

Geography
Pingyao is located on the east bank of the Fen River near the southwestern edge of the Taiyuan Basin. Pingyao County is adjacent to Qi County, whose seat is also a protected historical and cultural city.

Climate
The climate of Pingyao is temperate. It is cold in winter, often having northwestern winds with little snow and severe fog. In the spring, the temperature varies greatly between day and night, with a little rain and some winds. Summertime is often hot, humid and rainy. Autumn days have falling temperatures with little rain and are cool and clear with abundant sunshine.

Architecture
Pingyao still retains its urban layout from the Ming and Qing dynasties, conforming to a typical ba gua pattern. More than 300 sites in or near the city have ancient ruins. The city has over a hundred streets and lanes, lined with close to 4,000 17th–19th century shops and residences. The streets and storefronts still largely retain their historical appearance.

The city walls of Pingyao were constructed in 1370, the 3rd year of the Hongwu Emperor of the Ming. The town is accessed by six barbican gates, one each on the north and south walls and two each on the east and west walls. This pattern is similar to that of a turtle (the head, tail and four legs), earning Pingyao the moniker "Turtle City." Aside from the four structured towers at the four corners, there are also 72 watchtowers and more than 3,000 battlements. The number of defensive works supposedly represents the number of Confucius's disciples and other students. The walls are considered among the best-preserved ancient city walls on this scale.

Demographics
As of 2009, Pingyao had a population of 48,531 people living in 16,634 households. 12,132 residents held local hukous and 36,399 were from other parts of China.

Governments
Pingyao Ancient City and its environs are organized as the town of "Gutao", the seat of Pingyao County. Gutao directly oversees 10 administrative villages:

Economy
As of 2009, the town had a labour pool of 19,059 people. 3,811 farmers worked 9977mu of arable land, producing 33.7m RMB of crops, livestock, and other goods. The local focus is on increased mechanization and working the available land intensively. The area is well known for its beef and also produces grain and cotton. The rest of the workforce is divided between industry and the service sector, particularly tourism. Industry produced 840mRMB and was focused on improving the energy efficiency of its practices. A local specialty is lacquerware. The service sector, including tourism, produced less income than industry—790mRMB–but was growing rapidly and marked for special focus by local government.

Tourism

Increases in tourism have put pressure on Pingyao. During China's Golden Weeks, the number of visitors to the city has sometimes been as high as 2½ times its planned maximum capacity. During the single week around May Day in 2007, the town made about 94.5mRMB from visiting tourists.

Since that high point in 2007, the government has reduced the number and length of China's "golden weeks", spreading domestic tourism more equitably throughout the year. The Global Heritage Fund has also worked with the Pingyao County People's Government to protect the town against overdevelopment and damage from its high volume of visitors. The stated goal for their Pingyao Cultural Heritage Development Program is improved preservation of local vernacular architecture and traditional arts through improved planning and increased conservation efforts.

Culture
Local specialties include Pingyao beef (Píngyáo niúròu) and wantuo (Píngyáo wǎntuō), a favourite of the Empress Dowager Cixi. Other local products are Changshengyuan rice wine, bean flour minjian, and Jiupian.

The silver merchants of Pingyao in the early 20th century were the subject of the 2009 film Empire of Silver.

Gallery

References

External links

 Official website of Pingyao County Government 
 Pingyao preservation project summary at Global Heritage Fund
 Explore Pingyao with Google Earth on Global Heritage Network
 UN World Heritage - Pingyao
 Well illustrated guide to Pingyao

World Heritage Sites in China
Cities in Shanxi
History of Shanxi
Jinzhong
AAAAA-rated tourist attractions
Major National Historical and Cultural Sites in Shanxi
Pingyao County